
Dmitry Donskoy (1350–1389) was a Russian prince.

Dmitry Donskoy may also refer to:

People 
False Dmitry I, or Dmitriy I Donskoi of Moscow

Ships 
Russian submarine Dmitriy Donskoi (TK-208), a Typhoon-class submarine
 Russian cruiser Dmitrii Donskoi, an armoured cruiser launched in 1883 and scuttled after the Battle of Tsushima in 1905
 MV Dmitry Donskoy, a German cargo ship built in 1943 as Eberhart Essberger

Other 
Dmitry Donskoy (opera),  also known as The Battle of Kulikovo, the first opera written by Anton Rubinstein. 
Order of Saint Righteous Grand Duke Dmitry Donskoy,  an award of the Russian Orthodox Church
 Dimitri Donskoj (film), a 1909 Russian short film

See also 
Donskoy (disambiguation)
Donskoy (surname)